Beinn nan Oighreag (910 m) is a mountain in the Grampian Mountains of Scotland. It lies between Glen Lyon and Glen Lochay, on the border of Perthshire and Stirlingshire.

The mountain lies on a grassy ridge. Most walks start from Glen Lochay in the south. The closest village is Killin.

References

Mountains and hills of Stirling (council area)
Mountains and hills of Perth and Kinross
Marilyns of Scotland
Corbetts